Diaphania antillia is a moth in the family Crambidae. It was described by Eugene G. Munroe in 1960. It is found in Haiti, the Dominican Republic and Cuba.

References

Moths described in 1960
Diaphania